Robert Myddelton (by 1526 – 1566/67), of Ystrad and Denbigh, Denbighshire, was a Welsh politician.

He was a Member (MP) of the Parliament of England for Denbigh Boroughs in 1547.

References

1567 deaths
Robert
16th-century Welsh politicians
Members of the Parliament of England for Denbighshire
Members of the Parliament of England (pre-1707) for constituencies in Wales
English MPs 1547–1552
Year of birth uncertain